Lewis Richard McDonald (22 November 1881 – 18 September 1936) was an Australian politician. He was a Labor member of the Queensland Legislative Council from 1917 until its abolition in 1922.

References

1881 births
1936 deaths
Members of the Queensland Legislative Council
Place of birth missing
Australian Labor Party members of the Parliament of Queensland
20th-century Australian politicians